Ho Sun-hui (born 5 March 1980) is a female North Korean former football midfielder and now a referee.

She was part of the North Korea women's national football team at the 2008 Summer Olympics. On club level she played for Amrokkang.

International goals

See also
 North Korea at the 2008 Summer Olympics

References

External links
 
 
 
http://www.soccerpunter.com/players/19431-Sun-Hui-Ho
http://isiphotos.photoshelter.com/image/I0000wLVe72rEglE
http://www.gettyimages.ae/photos/north-korean-ho-sun-hui?excludenudity=true&sort=mostpopular&mediatype=photography&phrase=north%20korean%20ho%20sun%20hui

1980 births
Living people
North Korean women's footballers
Place of birth missing (living people)
Footballers at the 2008 Summer Olympics
Olympic footballers of North Korea
Women's association football midfielders
Asian Games medalists in football
Footballers at the 2002 Asian Games
Footballers at the 2006 Asian Games
People from Kilju County
2003 FIFA Women's World Cup players
2007 FIFA Women's World Cup players
North Korea women's international footballers
Asian Games gold medalists for North Korea
FIFA Century Club
Medalists at the 2002 Asian Games
Medalists at the 2006 Asian Games